Amba Maseena is a village in Ajmer tehsil of Ajmer district of Rajasthan state in India. The village falls under Doomara gram panchayat.

Demography
As per 2011 census of India, Amba Maseena has population of 2,677 of which 1,390 are males and 1,287 are females. Sex ratio of the village is 926.

Transportation
Amba Maseena is connected by air (Kishangarh Airport), by train (Daurai railway station) and by road.

See also
Ajmer Tehsil
Daurai railway station

References

Villages in Ajmer district